The 5th Annual GMA Dove Awards were held on 1973 recognizing accomplishments of musicians for the year 1972. The show was held in Nashville, Tennessee.

External links
 

GMA Dove Awards
1973 music awards
1973 in American music
1973 in Tennessee
GMA